Ann Elaine Johnson (born 28 September 1933) is a British sprinter. She competed in the women's 200 metres at the 1952 Summer Olympics. She also represented England in the 220 yards and long jump at the 1954 British Empire and Commonwealth Games in Vancouver, Canada.

References

1933 births
Living people
Athletes (track and field) at the 1952 Summer Olympics
Athletes (track and field) at the 1954 British Empire and Commonwealth Games
British female sprinters
English female sprinters
British female long jumpers
English female long jumpers
Olympic athletes of Great Britain
Place of birth missing (living people)
Commonwealth Games competitors for England